Distributed presence is a digital marketing term that means distributing a brand's presence through multiple communications channels to effectively reach target consumers.  Brands have an arsenal of tactics today to reach and communicate with consumers, some of which include: video, audio, email, websites and microsites, paid media, search engine optimization and search engine marketing, blogging, social media, social influence programs, web content syndication and distribution, widgets, gadgets, word-of-mouth and viral marketing programs, mobile media, mobile text marketing, mobile applications, convergent media, etc.

See also
Media (communication)
Multichannel marketing
Marketing strategy

References

Brand management